The women's 4 x 100 metres relay event at the 2001 European Athletics U23 Championships was held in Amsterdam, Netherlands, at Olympisch Stadion on 15 July.

Medalists

Results

Final
15 July

Participation
According to an unofficial count, 24 athletes from 6 countries participated in the event.

 (4)
 (4)
 (4)
 (4)
 (4)
 (4)

References

4 x 100 metres relay
Relays at the European Athletics U23 Championships